is a Japanese football player who playing for Fukushima United from 2023.

Career 

On 23 December 2022, Miyazaki announcement officially transfer to J3 club, Fukushima United for upcoming 2023 season.

Career statistics 

Updated to the end 2022 season.

Club

References

External links
Profile at Júbilo Iwata

Tomohiko Miyazaki Profile at The Rising Sun News

1986 births
Living people
Ryutsu Keizai University alumni
Association football people from Tokyo
Japanese footballers
J1 League players
J2 League players
J3 League players
Kashima Antlers players
Yokohama FC players
Júbilo Iwata players
Fagiano Okayama players
Fukushima United FC players
Association football midfielders